Marius Julian Reksjø (born 3 October 1973 in Horten, Norway) is a Norwegian jazz musician (upright bass), known from cooperation within Bugge Wesseltoft's Jazzland Community and the band Beady Belle with his wife Beate S. Lech.

Career 
Reksjø studied music at the University of Oslo, was first bassist of the group Insert Coin. He was known from collaboration within Eivind Aarset's band Electronique Noir, on whose album Light Extracts (2001) he played, and with Bugge Wesseltoft he released the albums Moving (2001) and Jazzland Community 2007. With the Bobby Hughes Combination he recorded the album Nhu Golden Era on (2002). He also appeared with the Danish rock band The Savage Rose, and the singer-songwriter Jan Eggum on the albums Deilig (1999) and 30/30 (2005).
He teaches bass at the "Høgskolen i Staffeldtsgate".

With his wife, the singer Beate S. Lech he formed the band Beady Belle in 1999. Their debut album Home (2001) was followed by the albums Cewbeagappic (2004), Closer (2005) and Belvedere (2008).

Discography 
Within Beady Belle
2001: Home (Jazzland)
2003: Cewbeagappic (Jazzland)
2005: Closer (Jazzland)
2008: Belvedere (Jazzland), includes duets with India Arie Simpson and Jamie Cullum
2010: At Welding Bridge (Jazzland)

With Jan Eggum
1999: Deilig (Grappa Music)
2005: 30/30 (Grappa Music)

With Bugge Wesseltoft
2001: Moving (Jazzland)
2007: Jazzland Community (Jazzland)

With Bobby Hughes Combination
2002: Nhu Golden Era

With "Folk og Røvere"
2002: Bagateller (Voices Music & Entertainment)
2003: Sommer Hele Året: 96-04 (Voices Music & Entertainment), compilation

With Eivind Aarset
2001: Light Extracts (Jazzland)
2004: Connected (Jazzland)
2007: Sonic Codex (Jazzland)

With Beate S. Lech
2011: Min song og hjarteskatt (Kirkelig Kulturverksted)

References

External links 
Beady Belle Official Website

1973 births
Living people
Musicians from Horten
Norwegian jazz upright-bassists
Male double-bassists
Jazz double-bassists
Norwegian jazz composers
Nu jazz musicians
ECM Records artists
21st-century double-bassists
21st-century Norwegian male musicians